The Mahavavy or Mahavavy-Nord River is a river of northern Madagascar in the region of Diana. It has its sources at the Maromokotra peak in the Tsaratanana Massif and flows north to the Indian Ocean. The main city along the river is Ambilobe.

It crosses a fertile plain and the waters are used for the irrigation of 5500 ha, of mostly, cotton plantations. Its delta covers 500 km.

References

Rivers of Diana Region
Rivers of Madagascar